Uma Shankar Dikshit (12 January 1901 – 30 May 1991) was an Indian politician, cabinet minister and Governor of West Bengal and Governor of Karnataka.

Life

He was born on 12 January 1901 at village Ugu of Unnao of Uttar Pradesh state, to Ram Sarup and Shiv Pyari. He later studied at the Christ Church College, Kanpur. As a student, he joined the freedom movement and became the Secretary of the District Congress Committee Kanpur during the period when Ganesh Shankar Vidyarthi was the President of the Committee.

He served the Country as the Home Minister, Health Minister and Governor of Karnataka & West Bengal. He also served as treasurer of All India Congress Committee, and Managing Director of Associated Journals at Lucknow. He founded a Girls Intermediate College at his village Ugu in the memory of his mother.
He was awarded Padma Vibhushan, the second highest civilian award in India in 1989, by the Government of India.

Career

After Independence, he remained close to Nehru and later sided with Indira Gandhi during the 1969 split in Indian National Congress. He joined the Indira Gandhi cabinet in 1971, thereafter he remained Minister for Works and Housing, Govt. of India, 1971-72 later given additional charge of Health and Family Planning, Minister for Home Affairs, 1973–74 and Minister for Shipping and Transport, 1975. He also remained Treasurer, All India Congress Committee (AICC), 1970-75.

He remained the Governor of Karnataka, 1976–77 and Governor of West Bengal 1984-1986.

He died at New Delhi on 30 May 1991 after a prolonged illness at the age of 90 years.

References

1901 births
1991 deaths
People from Unnao district
Indian independence activists from Uttar Pradesh
Indian National Congress politicians
Members of the Cabinet of India
Governors of West Bengal
Governors of Karnataka
Recipients of the Padma Vibhushan in public affairs
Ministers of Internal Affairs of India
Leaders of the Rajya Sabha
Rajya Sabha members from Uttar Pradesh
Health ministers of India